Sefer Hamitzvot ("Book of Commandments", Hebrew: ספר המצוות ) is a work by the 12th century rabbi, philosopher and physician Maimonides. While there are various other works titled similarly, the title "Sefer Hamitzvot" without a modifier refers to Maimonides' work. It is a listing of all the commandments of the Torah, with a brief description for each.

It originally appeared in Arabic under the title "Kitab al-Farai'd", and was translated by the Provençal rabbi Moses ibn Tibbon (first printed 1497) as well as by ibn Hasdai, in the 13th century. A new Hebrew translation from the original Arabic was made by the noted Yemenite scholar, Rabbi Yosef Qafih.

Premise
In the work, the Rambam lists all the 613 mitzvot traditionally contained in the Torah (Pentateuch). He describes the following fourteen principles (Hebrew: כללים) to guide his selection.  (Note: For each rule, Maimonides cites many illustrative examples.  We present only one or two examples for each rule.)
 Commandments of Rabbinic origin (from the Oral Law) are not counted.  This rule excludes lighting candles on Hanukkah and reading Megillat Esther on Purim.
 Commandments that were derived using the 13 hermeneutic rules (Rabbi Yishmael's Rules) are not counted.  This rule excludes reverence for Torah scholars, which Rabbi Akiva derived from the verse, "You must revere God your Lord" (Deut. 10:20).
 Commandments that are not historically permanent are not counted. This rule excludes the prohibition that Levites aged 50 years or older may not serve in the Tabernacle (Numbers 8:25).
 Commandments that encompass the entire Torah are not counted. This rule excludes the command to "keep everything that I have instructed you" Exodus 23:13).
 The reason for a commandment is not counted as a separate commandment.  For example, the Torah forbids a wife to remarry her first husband after she has married a second husband.  The Torah then adds, "and do not bring guilt upon the land" (Deut. 24:4).  This last statement is a reason that explains the preceding prohibition, so it is not counted separately.
 For a commandment with both positive and negative components, the positive component counts as a positive instruction, while the negative component counts as a negative prohibition. For example, the Torah commands to rest on the Sabbath and forbids against doing work on that day.  Resting counts as a positive instruction, and working counts as a negative prohibition.
 Details of a commandment, that define how it applies, are not counted. For example, the Torah commands certain sinners to bring an animal sin-offering.  If they cannot afford it, they may bring two birds instead; and if they cannot afford birds, they may bring a flour-offering instead (Leviticus chapter 5).  Thus, a wealthy sinner sacrifices an animal, but a destitute sinner brings a flour-offering.  This type of variable sin-offering (the korban `oleh ve-yored) counts as one commandment, even though it includes three different scenarios, depending on the wealth of the sinner.
 The negation of an obligation (Hebrew: shelilah, "is not") is not treated as a prohibition (azharah, "do not"). This appears obvious, but confusion arises because the Hebrew word lo can mean either "is not" or "do not." The rule excludes the statement that a Jewish maidservant "shall not leave [her master] the way other slaves leave" (Exodus 21:7). A master who causes his male slave to lose an eye, tooth or limb must grant him freedom, but the female maidservant is not granted such freedom.  The verse simply states a fact; it does not command or forbid any activity, so it does not count.
 Even if the same instruction or prohibition is repeated many times, it counts only once.  In other words, it is correct to count the number of concepts, not the number of statements. For example, the Torah prohibits eating blood in seven different verses (Lev. 3:17, 7:26 and elsewhere), but this prohibition counts only once.
 Introductory preparations for performance of a commandment are not counted separately. For example, priests are commanded to place show-bread (lechem ha-panim) on the Table (shulchan) in the Tabernacle.  The details regarding how to bake the bread (Lev. 24:5-7) are not counted.
 The parts of a commandment are not counted separately if their combination is necessary for that commandment. For example, the four species for Sukkot are considered one commandment, not four, because a person cannot fulfill this commandment without all four species.
 The activities necessary to fulfill a commandment are not counted separately. For example, the slaughtering of a burnt-offering (`olah), and sprinkling its blood, and removing the animal's hide, etc. are not counted separately. Rather, the entire process of sacrificing an olah counts as one commandment.
 A commandment that is performed on many days is only counted once. For example, the additional mussaf offering for the seven days of Sukkot counts as one commandment, even though a different number of cows is offered each day. (See positive commandment number 50.)
 Each form of punishment is counted as a positive instruction. For example, the Torah commands Beit Din to apply capital punishment by stoning to a blasphemer (Lev. 24:16), a Molech worshipper (20:2), and other sinners.  This punishment counts once, even though it appears in many different contexts.

Commentaries
The work is the subject of a number of commentaries, including one from Nahmanides, one titled Megillath Esther ("Scroll of Esther", by Isaac Leon ibn Zur (although often incorrectly attributed to Isaac de Leon), bearing no direct relationship with the Biblical Book of Esther), and others titled Lev Sameach and Kinath Soferim. In an appendix, Nahmanides lists commandments that might have merited individual inclusion in his estimation.

Influence
This work is regarded as the most authoritative listing of the commandments, and numerous later works rely on its enumeration (some with minor variations).

After their promotion by the late Rabbi Menachem Mendel Schneerson, several of Maimonides's works are studied daily by followers of the Chabad movement.

See also
 Daily Rambam Study
 Sefer Mitzvot Gadol
 Sefer Mitzvot Katan
 Sefer ha-Chinuch

References

External links
 English translation based on Rabbi Yosef Qafih's Hebrew translation by Rabbi Berel Bell (sans Maimonides' Introduction and Principles).
 Rabbi Yosef Qafih's edition in the original Arabic with his facing Hebrew translation (first 40 pages viewable for free). Includes Qafih's introduction to the work.
 Hebrew fulltext: Rabbi Yosef Qafih's translation as typed and reset HTML text, albeit lacking his introduction to the book (see previous entry) and comments.

Rabbinic legal texts and responsa
Works by Maimonides